George Sneddon (born 1949) in Winchburgh is a former Scottish international lawn and indoor bowls player.

Bowls career
He won a gold medal in the pairs with Alex Marshall at the 2000 World Outdoor Bowls Championship in Johannesburg. He also won a bronze medal in the fours.

Sneddon won the gold medal in the pairs once again (with Marshall) but at the 2002 Commonwealth Games.

He was National singles champion in 1991  and triples champion in 1998.

In 2000, he won the Hong Kong International Bowls Classic singles title and the following year won the pairs title with Marshall.

References

Scottish male bowls players
Living people
1949 births
Bowls World Champions
Commonwealth Games gold medallists for Scotland
Commonwealth Games medallists in lawn bowls
Bowls players at the 2002 Commonwealth Games
Medallists at the 2002 Commonwealth Games